CMON Limited, formerly known as CoolMiniOrNot is a publicly listed miniatures and board game publisher, trading on the Hong Kong Stock Exchange. It also operates a miniatures related site coolminiornot.com  that features user submitted images of their painted models for voting.

History
CoolMiniOrNot was founded as a community site for posting images of painted miniatures, inspired by Hot or Not style dating sites.

It later began publishing board games and miniature games, notable titles include Super Dungeon Explore in 2011 and Zombicide in 2012.

Some of its games are critically acclaimed, with three games (Xenoshyft, Rum and Bones and Blood Rage) making The Dice Tower's top 10 games of 2015.

On December 2, 2016, CMON Limited began publicly trading on the GEM board of the Hong Kong Stock Exchange.

Trading of CMON Ltd was halted on April 1, 2020 after having audit issues.

Kickstarter activity
CoolMiniOrNot has used Kickstarter with relative success occupying several places in the Most Funded Tabletop Games category.  The total amount raised thus far is $38,112,581, and the company actively pursues a strategy of Kickstarter to create new products.

Other activity

Tabletopgamingnews.com
CoolMiniOrNot acquired Tabletopgamingnews.com in 2011 and currently operates it.

Ravage USA
CoolMiniOrNot publishes the English language edition of Ravage magazine.

Crystal Brush painting competition
The company also organizes an annual miniature figure painting competition with a cash purse of $10,000, $2,000 and $1,000 for the overall winners. The competition has guest judges which account for 50% of the total score, with a 12 hour Internet vote making up the remaining 50%.

References

External links
 
 Tabletopgamingnews.com
 Ravage USA
 Crystal Brush official site
 KA | Board Game News

Companies based in Fulton County, Georgia
Gaming miniatures companies
Board game publishing companies
Internet properties established in 2001